Ricky Simón (born August 31, 1992) is an American mixed martial artist. He was the former Legacy Fighting Alliance Bantamweight Champion and currently competing in the Bantamweight division in the Ultimate Fighting Championship (UFC). As of March 13, 2023, he is #9 in the UFC bantamweight rankings.

Background 
Simón was born in Pendleton, Oregon. Coming from a tight-knit family of Mexican immigrants, his three brothers, Carlos Simón, Brandon Simón, Avi Simón and Ricky have the same tattoo "Simón" inked across their upper back. Simón also grew up with his close second cousin and fellow UFC athlete Vince Morales. Simón started training in wrestling at nine years old. He graduated class of 2010 from Union High School in Camas, WA, where he also wrestled and placed seventh in the state in his sophomore year. After his post-graduation plans to be a collegiate wrestler for Clark College did not materialize, he transitioned to mixed martial arts.

Mixed martial arts career

Early career 
Simón amassed an amateur record of 3–0 before turning professional in 2014. After compiling a professional record of 12–1, fighting for Main Event Sports, King of the Cage (KOTC), Titan Fighting Championship and he was the formal Legacy Fighting Alliance Bantamweight Champion prior joining the UFC.

Ultimate Fighting Championship 
In his UFC debut, Simón faced Merab Dvalishvili on April 21, 2018, at UFC Fight Night: Barboza vs. Lee in Atlantic City, New Jersey. In the final round, Simón mounted Dvalshvili with a guillotine choke, while Dvalishvili kicked his way to the end of the bell. Referee, Liam Kerriga, awarded the win to Simón citing Dvalshivili was thought to have been  passed out by the ref who eventually stopped the fight. Dvalishvilli's manager Matthew Culley filed a request to the commission to review the referee decision and the appeal was denied. This fight earned him the Fight of the Night award.

Simón was scheduled to face Benito Lopez at UFC 227 on August 4, 2018. However, it was reported that Lopez pulled out from the bout for undisclosed reason and was replaced by Montel Jackson. He won the fight via unanimous decision.

Simón was expected to face Ricardo Ramos on November 10, 2018, at UFC Fight Night 139. However, it was reported on October 16, 2018, that Ramos was pulled from the bout due to a hand injury and in turn, Simón was removed from the card as well.

Simón faced Rani Yahya on February 10, 2019, at UFC 234. He won the fight via unanimous decision, knocking Yahya down multiple times in the first round.

Simón faced Urijah Faber on July 13, 2019, at UFC Fight Night 155. He lost the fight via technical knockout in round one.

Simón faced Rob Font at UFC on ESPN 7 on December 7, 2019. He lost the fight via unanimous decision. This fight earned him the Fight of the Night award.

As the first fight of his new, four-fight contract, Simón faced Ray Borg on May 13, 2020, at UFC Fight Night: Smith vs. Teixeira. He won the fight via split decision.

Simón was scheduled to face Brian Kelleher in a featherweight bout on September 5, 2020, at UFC Fight Night 176. However, Simón's cornerman tested positive for COVID-19 and he was forced to withdraw from the event. The pair was rescheduled on January 16, 2021, at UFC on ABC 1. In turn, Kelleher also tested positive on January 1 and was pulled from the bout. He was replaced by newcomer Gaetano Pirrello and the bout took place four days later at UFC on ESPN: Chiesa vs. Magny. He won the bout via second round arm triangle submission.

The bout between Simón and Brian Kelleher was rebooked for the third time and took place at UFC 258 on February 13, 2021. He won the fight via unanimous decision.

Simón was scheduled to face Timur Valiev on September 25, 2021, at UFC 266. However, the bout was never officially announced by the promotion and Valiev was instead scheduled to face Daniel Santos at UFC Fight Night: Vieira vs. Tate.

As the first bout of his new four-fight contract, Simón faced Raphael Assunção on December 18, 2021, at UFC Fight Night: Lewis vs. Daukaus. Simón won the fight via knockout in the second round.

Simón faced Jack Shore on July 16, 2022 at UFC on ABC 3. He won the fight via arm-triangle submission in the second round. This win earned Simón his first Performance of the Night bonus award.

Simón is scheduled to face Song Yadong on April 22, 2023, at UFC Fight Night 222.

Personal life 
Simón used to be a middle school wrestling coach. He is the cousin of fellow UFC bantamweight fighter Vince Morales.

Simón has a daughter, born in November 2022.

Championships and accomplishments

Mixed martial arts
Ultimate Fighting Championship
Fight of the Night (Two times) 
 Performance of the Night (One time) 
Legacy Fighting Alliance
LFA Bantamweight Championship (One time)
One successful title defense

Mixed martial arts record 

|-
|Win
|align=center|20–3
|Jack Shore
|Submission (arm-triangle choke)
|UFC on ABC: Ortega vs. Rodríguez
|
|align=center|2
|align=center|3:28
|Elmont, New York, United States
|
|-
|Win
|align=center|19–3
|Raphael Assunção
|KO (punches)
|UFC Fight Night: Lewis vs. Daukaus
|
|align=center|2
|align=center|2:14
|Las Vegas, Nevada, United States
|
|-
|Win
|align=center|18–3
|Brian Kelleher
|Decision (unanimous)
|UFC 258
|
|align=center|3
|align=center|5:00
|Las Vegas, Nevada, United States
|
|-
|Win
|align=center|17–3
|Gaetano Pirrello
|Submission (arm-triangle choke)
|UFC on ESPN: Chiesa vs. Magny
|
|align=center|2
|align=center|4:00
|Abu Dhabi, United Arab Emirates
|  
|-
|Win
|align=center|16–3
|Ray Borg
|Decision (split)
|UFC Fight Night: Smith vs. Teixeira
|
|align=center|3
|align=center|5:00
|Jacksonville, Florida, United States
|
|-
|Loss
|align=center|15–3
|Rob Font
|Decision (unanimous)
|UFC on ESPN: Overeem vs. Rozenstruik
|
|align=center|3
|align=center|5:00
|Washington, D.C., United States
|
|-
|Loss
|align=center|15–2
|Urijah Faber
|TKO (punches)
|UFC Fight Night: de Randamie vs. Ladd
|
|align=center|1
|align=center|0:46
|Sacramento, California, United States
|
|-
|Win
|align=center|15–1
|Rani Yahya
|Decision (unanimous)
|UFC 234
|
|align=center|3
|align=center|5:00
|Melbourne, Australia
| 
|-
|Win
|align=center|14–1
|Montel Jackson
|Decision (unanimous)
|UFC 227
|
|align=center|3
|align=center|5:00
|Los Angeles, California, United States
|
|-
|Win
|align=center|13–1
|Merab Dvalishvili
|Technical Submission (guillotine choke)
|UFC Fight Night: Barboza vs. Lee
|
|align=center|3
|align=center|5:00
|Atlantic City, New Jersey, United States
|
|-
|Win
|align=center|12–1
|Vinicius Zani
|KO (punches)
|LFA 36
|
|align=center|1
|align=center|0:59
|Cabazon, California, United States
|
|-
|Win
|align=center|11–1
|Chico Camus
|Decision (unanimous)
|LFA 29
|
|align=center|5
|align=center|5:00
|Prior Lake, Minnesota, United States
|
|-
|Win
|align=center|10–1
|Donavon Frelow
|Decision (split)
|Dana White's Contender Series 5
|
|align=center|3
|align=center|5:00
|Las Vegas, Nevada, United States
|
|-
|Win
|align=center|9–1
|Charon Spain
|Submission (arm-triangle choke)
|KOTC: Headstrong
|
|align=center|1
|align=center|1:59
|Lincoln City, Oregon, United States
|
|-
|Win
|align=center|8–1
|Eduardo Torres
|Decision (unanimous)
|KOTC: Heavy Trauma
|
|align=center|3
|align=center|5:00
|Lincoln City, Oregon, United States
|
|-
|Loss
|align=center|7–1
|Anderson dos Santos
|Technical Submission (rear-naked choke)
|Titan FC 37
|
|align=center|2
|align=center|2:38
|Ridgefield, Washington, United States
|
|- 
|Win
|align=center|7–0
|Alex Soto
|Decision (unanimous)
|Titan FC 35
|
|align=center|3
|align=center|5:00
|Ridgefield, Washington, United States
|
|-
|Win
|align=center|6–0
|Jeremiah Labiano
|Decision (split)
|TPF 24
|
|align=center|3
|align=center|5:00
|Lemoore, California, United States
|
|-
|Win
|align=center|5–0
|Paul Njoku
|Decision (unanimous)
|KOTC; Warrior's Spirit
|
|align=center|3
|align=center|5:00
|Lincoln City, Oregon, United States
|
|-
|Win
|align=center|4–0
|Cole Milani
|TKO (punches)
|FCFF: Rumble at the Roseland 80
|
|align=center|1
|align=center|0:55
|Portland, Oregon, United States
|
|-
|Win
|align=center|3–0
|John Martinez
|TKO (punches)
|Main Event MMA 3
|
|align=center|1
|align=center|3:41
|Longview, Washington, United States
|
|-
|Win
|align=center|2–0
|Kendall Ward
|TKO (punches)
|Main Event MMA 2
|
|align=center|1
|align=center|0:49
|Vancouver, Washington, United States
|
|-
|Win
|align=center|1–0
|Alex Eastman
|TKO (punches)
|Main Event MMA 1
|
|align=center|1
|align=center|1:34
|Vancouver, Washington, United States
|
|-

See also 
 List of current UFC fighters
 List of male mixed martial artists

References

External links
 
 

1992 births
Living people
American male mixed martial artists
Sportspeople from Vancouver, Washington
American sportspeople of Mexican descent
Mixed martial artists from Washington (state)
Bantamweight mixed martial artists
Mixed martial artists utilizing wrestling
Mixed martial artists utilizing Brazilian jiu-jitsu
Ultimate Fighting Championship male fighters
American practitioners of Brazilian jiu-jitsu